Time Air was an airline in Canada founded in 1966 by businessman Walter “Stubb” Ross from Lethbridge in Alberta. It was called Lethbridge Air Service before becoming Time Airways Ltd. in 1969, which was later shortened to Time Air Ltd. In 1993 it was merged with Ontario Express to create
Canadian Regional Airlines.

History
Time Air (ICAO Code: TAF; IATA Code: KI; Call Sign: Time Air) began with "Stubb" Ross flying the aircraft and picking up passengers from their Lethbridge homes. The airline was initially based at the Lethbridge Airport. Time Air quickly filled a void that was left in southern Alberta when Air Canada ceased flying Vickers Viscount turboprop service from Lethbridge nonstop to Calgary and direct to Edmonton in the early 1970s. Over the next 20 years Time Air's fleet progressed from the 20-passenger  de Havilland Canada DHC-6 Twin Otter, to the 30-passenger Short 330. Time Air was the first airline to operate the Short 330 (known as the "Flying Boxcar" for their boxy shape)  The airline also operated Fairchild F-27 turboprops.  The next addition was the 50-passenger de Havilland Canada DHC-7 Dash 7 before standardising with the Bombardier DHC-8 Dash 8. It received the first stretched Dash 8 Series 300 aircraft in the world on February 27, 1989. The 36-passenger Short 360 was introduced next for shorthaul flying in British Columbia, primarily between Vancouver and Victoria.
The airline acquired a number of other scheduled carriers, most notably Calgary-based Southern Frontier Airlines and Saskatoon-based Norcanair. As a result, Time Air briefly operated other aircraft types, including a number of Convair CV- 580 and Convair CV-640 turboprops. Time Air also flew Fokker F28 Fellowship twin jet aircraft. F28 jet operations were very successful, leading the airline to acquire a number of additional aircraft, eventually becoming the world's largest operator of the type at the time.  By 1999, Fairchild Swearingen Metroliner commuter propjets as well as F28 jets and Dash 8 turboprops were being operated on Canadian Regional code share flights into Calgary.

Canadian Airlines International (formed when Pacific Western Airlines took over CP Air) acquired a minority interest in Time Air in the late 1980s and acquired 100% ownership in January 1991. At the same time Canadian Airlines International created a holding company called Canadian Regional Airlines to manage its investments in Time Air and other regional carriers (which included Ontario Express and Inter-Canadien).

In April 1993 Canadian Regional Airlines branded the operations of Time Air and Ontario Express as "Canadian Regional Airlines" with both airlines using Canadian Airlines International two letter "CP" code for their flight numbers via a code sharing arrangement.  In 1995, Time Air was operating Canadian Airlines Partner code share passenger feed service.  Time Air and Ontario Express were legally amalgamated in July 1998, using Time Air's air operator certificate. By then Inter-Canadien had become a wholly owned subsidiary of Canadian Regional Airlines, although it continued to operate as a separate brand. Canadian Regional Airlines was merged into Air Canada Jazz in 2001, following Air Canada's acquisition of Canadian Airlines International.

Destinations in 1970
According to the October 25, 1970 Time Airways system timetable, the airline was operating scheduled passenger service to only five destinations, all located in the province of Alberta:
 Calgary
 Edmonton
 Lethbridge
 Medicine Hat
 Red Deer

By early 1976, Time Air had expanded service to one additional destination in Alberta, being Grande Prairie, while continuing to serve the other five destinations listed above and its fleet was composed of two turboprop aircraft types at this time:  the Fokker F27 Friendship and the STOL capable de Havilland Canada DHC-6 Twin Otter.  The airline was also serving close-in Edmonton Industrial Airport (YXD, which was later renamed Edmonton City Centre Airport and is now closed) instead of Edmonton International Airport (YEG) and was competing with Pacific Western Airlines on the Calgary-Edmonton route. Time Air continued to compete on this route and by the spring of 1981 was operating the STOL capable de Havilland Canada DHC-7 Dash 7 on all of its flights between Calgary and Edmonton.

Destinations in 1988 

According to the October 30, 1988 Time Air system route map, the airline was operating scheduled passenger service to the following destinations in Canada and the United States:
 Calgary, Alberta - Hub
 Campbell River, British Columbia
 Castlegar, British Columbia
 Cold Lake, Alberta
 Comox, British Columbia
 Dawson Creek, British Columbia
 Edmonton, Alberta - Hub
 Fort Chipewyan, Alberta
 Fort McMurray, Alberta
 Fort Nelson, British Columbia
 Fort St. John, British Columbia
 Grande Prairie, Alberta
 High Level, Alberta
 Kamloops, British Columbia
 Kelowna, British Columbia
 La Ronge, Saskatchewan
 Lethbridge, Alberta
 Lloydminster, Alberta
 Medicine Hat, Alberta
 Minneapolis/St. Paul, Minnesota
 Nanaimo, British Columbia
 Peace River, Alberta
 Penticton, British Columbia
 Port Hardy, British Columbia
 Prince Albert, Saskatchewan
 Quesnel, British Columbia
 Rainbow Lake, Alberta
 Regina, Saskatchewan
 Saskatoon, Saskatchewan - Focus city
 Seattle, Washington
 Stony Rapids, Saskatchewan
 Uranium City, Saskatchewan
 Vancouver, British Columbia - Hub
 Victoria, British Columbia
 Watson Lake, Yukon
 Williams Lake, British Columbia
 Winnipeg, Manitoba
 Wollaston Lake, Saskatchewan

Time Air was operating two international routes to the U.S. at this time:  Vancouver-Seattle and Regina-Minneapolis/St. Paul. Service to Seattle was operated with de Havilland Canada DHC-7 Dash 7 and DHC-8 Dash 8 propjet aircraft with multiple flights a day while service to Minneapolis/St. Paul was flown daily with a Fokker F28 twin jet.  The only other international route flown by Time Air was nonstop service between Lethbridge and Great Falls, Montana which was operated earlier in 1988; however, by October 1988, the airline had ceased all service on this route.

Fleet
 Convair CV-580
 Convair CV-640
 de Havilland Canada DHC-6 Twin Otter
 de Havilland Canada Dash 7
 de Havilland Canada Dash 8
 Fairchild Swearingen Metroliner
 Fairchild F-27
 Fokker F28 Fellowship - Only jet aircraft type ever operated by Time Air.  Operated as well by Norcanair.
 Short 330
 Short 360

See also 
 List of defunct airlines of Canada

References

External links

 Logos

Defunct airlines of Canada
Airlines established in 1966
Air Canada
Transport in Lethbridge
History of Lethbridge
Airlines disestablished in 1993
Companies based in Lethbridge
1966 establishments in Alberta
1993 disestablishments in Alberta
Defunct companies of Alberta
Canadian companies disestablished in 1993
Canadian companies established in 1966